Veppur is a block in the perambalur district of Tamil Nadu, India. Total 33 villages in veppur block in kunnam Taluk

Places of interest 
Veppur has one of its famous Mariamman Temple located in South Street (Old Colony), where there is festival every year in the Tamil month of Chithirai (April). The festival is conducted for 10 days making it one of the longest festival in the neighborhood.
People especially Women come here and pray with different problems and they believe that it gets solved. This Mariamman is considered one of the most powerful. 
Every year goats & hens are sacrificed by different classes of people after all their problems are solved.

References 

 

Revenue blocks of Perambalur district